Long Island Recreation Park is a protected area in the Australian state of South Australia occupying the full extent of Long Island in the Murray River immediately east of the city of Murray Bridge.
 
The island forming the recreation park first received protected area status on 9 October 1958 as a recreation reserve proclaimed under Crown Lands Act 1929 and to be managed by the Corporate Town of Murray Bridge. On 1 September 1966, it was proclaimed as a fauna sanctuary under the Fauna Conservation Act, 1964-1965. On 8 July 1976, the recreation reserve was resumed under Crown Lands Act 1929 and then proclaimed as the Long Island Recreation Park under the National Parks and Wildlife Act 1972.

As of 1980, it was reported as having "aesthetic and recreational value", as being a refuge for waterfowl and as supporting "a dense forest of introduced willow species with emergent Eucalyptus camaldulensis".

The recreation park is classified as an IUCN Category III protected area. In 1980, the recreation park was listed on the former Register of the National Estate.

See also
 List of islands within the Murray River in South Australia

References

External links
Long Island Recreation Park webpage on protected planet
Long Island Reserve

Recreation Parks of South Australia
Protected areas established in 1958
1958 establishments in Australia
Murray River
South Australian places listed on the defunct Register of the National Estate